Tarakanov is a rural locality (a khutor) in Alexeyevsky District, Belgorod Oblast, Russia. The population was 33 as of 2010. There is 1 street.

Geography 
Tarakanov is located 18 km southeast of Alexeyevka (the district's administrative centre) by road. Shaposhnikov is the nearest rural locality.

References 

Rural localities in Alexeyevsky District, Belgorod Oblast
Biryuchensky Uyezd